George Corbett (11 May 1925 – June 1999) is an English former professional footballer who played as a left back and left winger.

Career
Born in Walbottle, Corbett played for Shildon, Sheffield Wednesday, Spennymoor United, West Bromwich Albion, Workington and Berwick Rangers.

References

1925 births
1999 deaths
English footballers
Shildon A.F.C. players
Sheffield Wednesday F.C. players
Spennymoor United F.C. players
West Bromwich Albion F.C. players
Workington A.F.C. players
Berwick Rangers F.C. players
English Football League players
Scottish Football League players
Association football fullbacks
Association football wingers